Chikayoshi (written: 近説 or 親吉) is a masculine Japanese given name. Notable people with the name include:

, Japanese daimyō
, Japanese samurai and daimyō

Japanese masculine given names